The Women's Olympic Distance event at the 2010 South American Games was held at 12:00 on March 26.

Individual

Medalists

Results

Team

Medalists

Results

References
Report

Olympic distance